Bosia  may refer to:

Places
Italy
 Bosia, Piedmont, a comune in the Province of Cuneo

Romania
 Bosia, a village in Vultureni Commune, Bacău County
 Bosia, a village in Ungheni Commune, Iaşi County, and the former name of the commune until 1996